The Lola T610 was a ground effect Group C sports prototype race car, designed, developed and built by British manufacturer Lola, for sports car racing, specifically the IMSA GTP Championship, World Sportscar Championship and 24 Hours of Le Mans, between 1982 and 1984. A total of two models were produced.

References

T610
Group C cars